28th Infantry Division of Kordestan, based in Sanandaj, Kordestan Province, is a division of Ground Forces of Islamic Republic of Iran Army.

The division has participated in several operations of Iran–Iraq War.

References

Infantry divisions of Ground Forces of Islamic Republic of Iran Army